Albert Zurabovich Gabarayev (born 28 September 1997) is a Russian football player who plays for Tobol.

Career
On 10 February 2023, Kazakhstan Premier League club Tobol announced the signing of Gabarayev.

References

External links
 
 

1997 births
Sportspeople from North Ossetia–Alania
Living people
Russian footballers
Association football defenders
FC Rubin Yalta players
FC Gorodeya players
FC Volgar Astrakhan players
FC Noah players
FC Tobol players
Belarusian Premier League players
Crimean Premier League players
Russian First League players
Armenian Premier League players
Russian expatriate footballers
Expatriate footballers in Belarus
Russian expatriate sportspeople in Belarus
Expatriate footballers in Armenia
Russian expatriate sportspeople in Armenia
Expatriate footballers in Kazakhstan
Russian expatriate sportspeople in Kazakhstan